"A Boy Without a Girl" is a song written by Sid Jacobson and Ruth Sexton and performed by Frankie Avalon. The song reached #10 on the Billboard Top 100 in 1959.  It wad performed by Avalon in the 1964 film, Muscle Beach Party.

The song was arranged by Peter De Angelis.

The song was ranked No. 82 on Billboard magazine's Top Hot 100 songs of 1959.

Other versions
Terry Dene released a version as a single in the United Kingdom in August 1959.
Jimmy Crawford released a version as a single in the United Kingdom in May 1962.
Ronnie Hilton released a version as the B-side to his single "Rocky Old Boat" in the United Kingdom in December 1965.

References

1959 songs
1959 singles
1962 singles
Frankie Avalon songs
Decca Records singles
Columbia Records singles
Chancellor Records singles
Songs written by Sid Jacobson